The Liga Panameña de Radioaficionados (LPRA) (in English, Panamanian Amateur Radio League) is a national non-profit organization for amateur radio enthusiasts in Panama.   Key membership benefits of the LPRA include a QSL bureau for those amateur radio operators in regular communications with other amateur radio operators in foreign countries, and a network to support amateur radio emergency communications.  LPRA represents the interests of Panamanian amateur radio operators before Panamanian and international regulatory authorities.  LPRA is the national member society representing Panama in the International Amateur Radio Union.

References

External links
 "Manual de radioaficionados" of the Panama government, pages 19–22

Panama
Non-profit organizations based in Panama
Radio in Panama
Organizations based in Panama City